Eliza Fay (1755 or 1756 – 9 September 1816) was an English letter writer. She left graphic accounts of her travels and experiences in Europe and the Middle East.

Early life
Eliza was born in 1755 or 1756, probably in Rotherhithe, Surrey. She was one of three known daughters of Edward Clement (died 1794), a Rotherhithe shipwright. Her mother died in or before 1783. Little is known of her family. One of her sisters, Eleanor, married Thomas W. Preston.

Eliza married Anthony Fay, a barrister, on 6 February 1772 in London. The only son of Francis Fay of Rotherhithe, Surrey, and of Irish extraction, he intended to practise as an advocate in the Calcutta Supreme Court. The couple set out for India in April 1779 and he managed to enter himself on 16 June 1780, but he ran into debt and fathered an illegitimate child before returning to England, where he died some time before 1815. The couple separated in August 1781. There were no children of the marriage.

Passages to India
Fay's graphic letters begin in Paris on 18 April 1779; her account suggests she had been to France several times before. Then follows an eventful journey across the Alps, by sea to Egypt, then across the deserts of Egypt in a caravan that was attacked by bandits, only to be imprisoned on arrival in Calicut by Hyder Ali, King of Mysore. Eventually escaping with the help of a Jewish merchant from Cochin, Mr Isaac, she and her husband arrived in Calcutta in May 1780.

The letters reveal great narrative power and include what E. M. Forster, her editor, described as "little character sketches... delightfully malicious." She appears to have had religious convictions and a distaste for any indelicacy, also a command of French and an ability to learn other languages such as Italian, Portuguese and Hindustani at high speed, but otherwise not much education. Eliza Fay found her way into Calcutta society during her first period there, meeting several prominent people, including Warren Hastings, but this goodwill may have been dissipated by the wild behaviour of her husband, or possibly by her own ill temper. She was more interested than many in the life of the Indians around her and provides quite a lot of detail.

Fay obtained a legal separation from her husband in August 1781, and returned to England by way of Madras and St Helena in 1782, but set out again in 1784. This time her social status was lower and she supported herself with a millinery shop and by mantua making, but became bankrupt in 1788, although she continued to trade and paid off her creditors by 1793.

Her observation and interpretations of Indian society continued. Suttee (immolation of a widow), she opined, was not a proof of feeling, but "entirely a political scheme intended to insure the care and good offices of wives to their husbands." 

Her business partner Avis Hicks and Anthony Fay's son, whom Hicks was accompanying to England, drowned at sea in September 1786. Returning to England in 1794, Eliza inherited property in Glamorgan on the death of her father and became a merchant, but was dogged by disasters, so that bankruptcy ensued again in 1800. Her third visit to Calcutta in 1796 lasted only six months. She acquired another ship, loaded it with muslins and set off for the United States, but it sank in the mouth of the Hooghly. She managed by other means to reach New York City on 3 September 1797.

Sailing again for Calcutta in August 1804, she returned the following year with 14 children, to open a school at Ashburnam House, Blackheath. This she continued to run with a partner, Maria Cousins, until 1814. She stayed in Blackheath with Mrs Preston in 1815, before a final voyage to Calcutta, where she began to prepare her letters and papers for publication. She died at the age of 60 on 9 September 1816 in Calcutta.

Editions of the letters
Fay died insolvent, and her invaluable letters were handled by the administrator of her estate as one of her few assets. Her account of the first two voyages appeared in 1817 and, according to official records, made a profit for her creditors of 220 rupees in four years. However, the administrator "lost enthusiasm" according to E. M. Forster, so that the published versions go only up to 1797. The volume was reprinted in 1821. Later glimpses of her life, including some surviving manuscript pages, and English court and other archive materials, come from notes by her 1908 editor, Walter Kelly Firminger (1870–1940), author of the long-running Thacker's Guide to Calcutta. This edition was superseded in 1925 by E. M. Forster's scholarly edition, published by Hogarth Press. In 2010, this edition was again reprinted by New York Review Books with an introduction by Simon Winchester.

See also
Women letter writers

References

Bibliography
E. M. Forster: Introductory Notes. In: Original Letters from India (New York: NYRB, 2010 [1925]). 
Joan Mickelson-Gaughan, The "incumberances" [sic]: British Women in India, 1615–1856, 1st ed., New Delhi: Oxford University Press, 2013

Primary Sources
Eliza Fay, Original Letters from India, 1779–1815 (London, 1925)

Additional reading
Linda Colley, "Going Native, Telling Tales: Captivity, Collaborations and Empire", Past & Present, No. 168 (2000), pp. 170–193. Accessed 8 February 2021. http://www.jstor.org/stable/651308
Matthew Lockwood, "The birth of British India". To Begin the World Over Again: How the American Revolution Devastated the Globe, pp. 274–313. New Haven/London: Yale University Press, 2019. Accessed 8 February 2021. doi:10.2307/j.ctvnwc044.15. 
Mohamad Ali Hachicho, "English Travel Books about the Arab near East in the Eighteenth Century". Die Welt des Islams, New Series 9, no. 1/4 (1964), pp. 1–206. Accessed 8 February 2021. 

1750s births
1756 births
1816 deaths
18th-century British women writers
19th-century British women writers
19th-century British writers
English letter writers
Women letter writers
People from Rotherhithe
People from British India
British women travel writers
British travel writers
Writers from London
British milliners
18th-century English businesspeople
British people in colonial India
19th-century diarists
19th-century letter writers